Donald Stewart Lord (15 February 1875 – 3 July 1906) was an  Australian rules footballer who played with Geelong in the Victorian Football League (VFL). He died from pleurisy at the age of 31.

Notes

External links 

1875 births
1906 deaths
Australian rules footballers from Victoria (Australia)
Geelong Football Club players
Respiratory disease deaths in Victoria (Australia)